MLB SlugFest 2006 is a baseball video game developed by Blue Shift and published by Midway Games in 2006. It is the fourth and final game in the MLB Slugfest series.

Reception

The game received "mixed" reviews on both platforms according to the review aggregation website Metacritic.

References

External links
 

2006 video games
Baseball video games
Major League Baseball video games
Midway video games
North America-exclusive video games
PlayStation 2 games
Video games developed in the United States
Video games set in 2006
Xbox games